Zatyshne is a village in Kupiansk Raion, Kharkiv Oblast (province) of Ukraine. It belongs to Petropavlivka rural hromada, one of the hromadas of Ukraine.

References

Notes

Villages in Kupiansk Raion